Princepal Singh Bajwa (born 3 January 2001) is an Indian professional basketball player.

Early life and career
Singh is a native of Dera Baba Nanak, Punjab, India and grew up playing volleyball. In 2014, he travelled to Ludhiana to try out for a volleyball academy but instead drew the attention of Jaipal Singh, a coach at the Ludhiana Basketball Academy (LBA). Standing  at the time, he soon joined the LBA and learned how to play basketball from Jaipal Singh. In 2016, Singh earned a three-year full scholarship, worth $75,000, to play at SPIRE Institute and Academy in Geneva, Ohio but was unable to join the program after his visa was rejected twice. 

Singh trained at the NBA Academy India in New Delhi for 18 months, before being called up to the NBA Global Academy, a training center at the Australian Institute of Sport in Canberra, in May 2017. Singh trained at the Global Academy on a two-year contract. In 2019, he played for the BA Centre of Excellence in the NBL1.

In October 2019, he was named most valuable player (MVP) at the Indian Junior National Championship after leading Punjab to the title and scoring 40 points against Rajasthan in the final. Singh helped Punjab capture a gold medal in the under-21 category of the Khelo India Youth Games in January 2020.

Professional career

NBA G League Ignite (2021)
On 28 July 2020, Singh signed a one-year contract with the NBA G League Ignite, a developmental team affiliated with the NBA G League. He became the first NBA Academy India graduate to sign a professional contract. He played sparingly during the 2021 G League hub season, averaging 2.3 points in four games.

Singh was a member of the Sacramento Kings roster for the 2021 NBA Summer League. He was selected by the Stockton Kings with the fifth pick of the third round of the 2021 NBA G League draft.

New Zealand Breakers (2021–2022)
On 10 November 2021, Singh signed with the New Zealand Breakers of the Australian National Basketball League to a two-year development player contract. He parted ways with the Breakers in January 2022 before playing in a game for the team.

National team career

Junior national team
In September 2017, Singh led India to the gold medal at the SABA Under-16 Championship in Kathmandu, Nepal. He was named tournament MVP after scoring 20 points in a 131–50 win over Bhutan in his final game. In April 2018, Singh competed at the FIBA Under-16 Asian Championship in Foshan, China, averaging 22.7 points and 13 rebounds per game. At the 2018 FIBA Under-18 Asian Championship in Nonthaburi, Thailand, he averaged 15.5 points, 9.8 rebounds and 3.3 blocks per game as the captain of the Indian team.

Senior national team
In December 2018, Singh made his debut for the Indian senior national team at the Super Kung Sheung Cup International Championship in Hong Kong. In February 2020, he was selected to represent India for Window 1 of the 2021 FIBA Asia Cup qualification stage. In his first game, on 21 February, Singh recorded three points, five rebounds and two assists in 12 minutes in a 68–67 loss to Bahrain.

Career statistics

NBA G League

Regular season

|-
| style="text-align:left;"| 2020–21
| style="text-align:left;"| NBA G League
| 4 || 0 || 6.3 || .500 || 1.000 || .500 || 1.0 || .0 || .3 || .0 || 2.3
|- class="sortbottom"
| style="text-align:center;" colspan="2"| Career
| 4 || 0 || 6.3 || .500 || 1.000 || .500 || 1.0 || .0 || .3 || .0 || 2.3

Playoffs

|-
| style="text-align:left;"| 2020–21
| style="text-align:left;"| NBA G League
| 1 || 0 || 2.0 || – || – || – || .0 || .0 || .0 || .0 || .0
|- class="sortbottom"
| style="text-align:center;" colspan="2"| Career
| 1 || 0 || 2.0 || – || – || – || .0 || .0 || .0 || .0 || .0

Personal life
Singh's father, Gurmej Singh, is an electrician. His father stands  and his mother, Hardeep Kaur, stands .

References

External links
NBA G League profile
Asia-basket.com profile
fiba.com player profile

2001 births
Living people
Basketball players from Punjab, India
Centers (basketball)
Punjabi people
Indian expatriates in Australia
Indian expatriate sportspeople in the United States
Indian men's basketball players
NBA G League Ignite players
Sportspeople from Firozpur